Ratchaburi province or Rat Buri is one of Thailand's seventy-six provinces (changwat) lies in Western Thailand. Neighbouring provinces are (from north clockwise) Kanchanaburi, Nakhon Pathom, Samut Sakhon, Samut Songkhram and Phetchaburi. In the west it borders the Tanintharyi Region of Myanmar.

The Mae Klong flows through the centre of Ratchaburi town.

Geography
The eastern part of the province contains the flat river plains of the Mae Klong, crisscrossed by many khlongs. The most famous tourist spot in this area is the Damnoen Saduak Floating Market. The west of the province is more mountainous, and includes the Tenasserim Hills. As the mountains are made mostly of limestone, there are several caves containing stalactites. Some caves are inhabited by large colonies of bats, and it is an impressive sight when they swarm out in the evening to feed. Other caves like the Khao Bin are accessible for visitors.

The main river of the western part is the Phachi River. On the left bank of the Phachi is the Chaloem Phrakiat Thai Prachan National Park, along with eight other national parks, make up region 3 (Ban Pong) of Thailand's protected areas. There is one wildlife sanctuary, along with two other wildlife sanctuaries, make up region 3 (Ban Pong) of Thailand's protected areas. Mae Nam Phachi Wildlife Sanctuary, . 

The area of Ratchaburi province is divided into three parts. The second contains the Tenasserim mountains and forests with an elevation of about 200–300 meters. The central area of the province is rich in wetlands due to river flow. Moreover, it has minerals such as tin, tantalum, feldspar, quartz, limestone, and marlstone.

History
The history of the city of Ratchaburi dates back to the Dvaravati period, when it was an important city of the Mon Kingdom. Of the city of Khu Bua nearby only ruins remains. According to legend it dates back to the mythical Suvannabhumi Kingdom predating Dvaravati.

"Ratchaburi" means 'the land of the king'. Ratchaburi dates back to ancient times and was important during the Dvaravati period. The city of Ratchburi is on the banks of the Mae Klong River and was a town of the Suvarnabhumi Kingdom.

From the evidence of archaeological sites and many antiquities, believed that people have settled in this area since the Middle Stone Age, as well as discovering an ancient city in the Dvaravati period at Mueang Ratchaburi district. King Rama I used to take a position of Royal Yokkrabat of Ratchaburi in the late Ayutthaya period.

In the late Ayutthaya period and early Rattanakosin period, there is historical evidence that Ratchaburi is an important frontier city, It is a battlefield for many ages. Especially during the reign of King Rama I has brought troops to set up the Burmese battle in Ratchaburi area many times, the most important one was the Burmese–Siamese War (1785–1786).

Later in 1817, In the reign of King Rama II has ordered to build a new city wall on the left bank of the Mae Klong River until the present. In the reign of King Rama V in 1894, has changed the government and included the city that are close together to set up as counties and included the city of Ratchaburi, Kanchanaburi, Samut Songkhram, Phetchaburi, Pran Buri and Prachuap Khiri Khan to set up as Ratchaburi county.

Demographics
Hill tribes, mostly Karen living near the Myanmar border, make up about one percent of the population. Some Mon, Lawa, Lao, Chinese and Khmer minorities live in the province.

Ratchaburi is 98.3 percent Buddhist.

Symbols
The provincial seal shows the royal sword above the royal sandals on a phan, as the name Ratchaburi means 'city of the king'. The name derives from the fact that King Rama I was born here. The provincial slogan is "Beautiful women of Photharam, exquisite women of Baan Pong, the city of earthenware jars, shadow plays at Wat Khanon, magnificent caves, floating market at Damnoen, bats, delicious Jullien's golden carp". The provincial flower is the Pink Shower Tree (Cassia bakeriana), and the provincial tree is  Wrightia pubescens. Jullien's golden carp (Probarbus jullieni) is a provincial fish, same as neighbouring province Kanchanaburi, that has good taste and flourished in the Mae Klong River in the past, but is now critically endangered.

Transportation

Rail
The main railway station in Ratchaburi is Ratchaburi railway station.

Health 
Ratchaburi Hospital is the main hospital of the province.

Administrative divisions

Provincial government
The province is divided into 10 districts (amphoes). The districts are further subdivided into 104 sub-districts (tambons) and 935 villages (mubans).

Local government
As of 26 November 2019 there are: one Ratchaburi Provincial Administration Organisation and 34 municipal (thesaban) areas in the province. Ratchaburi, Ban Pong, Tha Pha and Photharam have town (thesaban mueang) status. Further 30 subdistrict municipalities (thesaban tambon). The non-municipal areas are administered by 77 Subdistrict Administrative Organisations - SAO (ongkan borihan suan tambon).

Human achievement index 2017

Since 2003, United Nations Development Programme (UNDP) in Thailand has tracked progress on human development at sub-national level using the Human achievement index (HAI), a composite index covering all the eight key areas of human development. National Economic and Social Development Board (NESDB) has taken over this task since 2017.

Gallery

References

External links

Ratchaburi Thai Only
English website of province 
Ratchaburi Samanachan 

 
Provinces of Thailand